Quantitative analysis of behavior is the application of mathematical models--conceptualized from the robust corpus of environment-behavior-consequence interactions in published behavioral science--to the experimental analysis of behavior. The aim is to describe and/or predict relations between varying levels of independent environmental variables and dependent behavioral variables. The parameters in the models hopefully have theoretical meaning beyond their use in fitting models to data.  The field was founded by Richard Herrnstein (1961) when he introduced the matching law to quantify the behavior of organisms working on concurrent schedules of reinforcement. 

The field has integrated models from economics, zoology, philosophy, political science (including voter behavior) and psychology, especially mathematical psychology of which it is a branch.  The field is represented by the Society for Quantitative Analysis of Behavior.  Quantitative analysis of behavior addresses the following topics among others: behavioral economics, behavioral momentum, connectionist systems or neural networks, integration, hyperbolic discounting including the delay reduction hypothesis, foraging, hunting, errorless learning, creativity, learning, and the Rescorla-Wagner model, matching law, melioration, scalar expectancy, signal detection, neural hysteresis, and reinforcement control.

Concepts and models 

 Matching law
 Rate of response
 Rate of reinforcement
 Mathematical principles of reinforcement
 Behavioral momentum

References 

 Herrnstein, R. J.  (1961).  Relative and absolute strength of response as a function of frequency of reinforcement.  Journal of the Experimental Analysis of Behavior, 4, 267-272.
 Herrnstein, R. J.  (1970).  On the law of effect.  Journal of the Experimental Analysis of Behavior, 13: 243-266.

Influential people in quantitative analysis of behavior 

 John Anderson
 Michael Commons
 Robyn Dawes
 William Estes
 John Gibbon
 Richard Herrnstein
 Peter Richard Killeen
 R. Duncan Luce
 John Anthony Nevin
 Allen Newell
 Howard Rachlin
 Herbert A. Simon
 J. E. R. Staddon

 
Experimental psychology